Humanitarianism is an active belief in the value of human life, whereby humans practice benevolent treatment and provide assistance to other humans to reduce suffering and improve the conditions of humanity for moral, altruistic, and emotional reasons. One aspect involves voluntary emergency aid overlapping with human rights advocacy, actions taken by governments, development assistance, and domestic philanthropy. Other critical issues include correlation with religious beliefs, motivation of aid between altruism and social control, market affinity, imperialism and neo-colonialism, gender and class relations, and humanitarian agencies. A practitioner is known as a humanitarian.

An informal ideology
Humanitarianism is an informal ideology of practice; it is "the doctrine that people's duty is to promote human welfare."

Humanitarianism is based on a view that all human beings deserve respect and dignity and should be treated as such. Therefore, humanitarians work towards advancing the well-being of humanity as a whole. It is the antithesis of the "us vs. them" mentality that characterizes tribalism and ethnic nationalism. Humanitarians abhor slavery, violation of basic and human rights, and discrimination on the basis of features such as skin colour, religion, ancestry, or place of birth. Humanitarianism drives people to save lives, alleviate suffering, and promote human dignity in the middle of man-made or natural disasters. Humanitarianism is embraced by movements and people across the political spectrum. The informal ideology can be summed up by a quote from Albert Schweitzer: "Humanitarianism consists in never sacrificing a human being to a purpose."

A universal doctrine

Jean Pictet, in his commentary on The Fundamental Principles of the Red Cross, argues for the universal characteristics of humanitarianism:    
The wellspring of the principle of humanity is in the essence of social morality which can be summed up in a single sentence, Whatsoever ye would that men should do to you, do ye even so to them. This fundamental precept can be found, in almost identical form, in all the great religions, Brahminism, Buddhism, Christianity, Confucianism, Islam, Judaism and Taoism. It is also the golden rule of the positivists, who do not commit themselves to any religion but only to the data of experience, in the name of reason alone. It is indeed not at all necessary to resort to affective or transcendental concepts to recognize the advantage for men to work together to improve their lot.

Historical examples and periodization
Humanitarianism was publicly seen in the social reforms of the late 1800s and early 1900s, following the economic turmoil of the Industrial Revolution in England. Many of the women in Great Britain who were involved with feminism during the 1900s also pushed humanitarianism. The atrocious hours and working conditions of children and unskilled laborers were made illegal by pressure on Parliament by humanitarians. The Factory Act of 1833 and the Factory Act of 1844 were some of the most significant humanitarian bills passed in Parliament following the Industrial Revolution.

In the middle of the 19th century, humanitarianism was central to the work of Florence Nightingale and Henry Dunant in emergency response and in the latter case led to the founding of the Red Cross.

The Humanitarian League (1891–1919) was an English advocacy group, formed by Henry S. Salt, which sought to advance the humanitarian cause.

Various suggestions of distinct periods of humanitarianism exist, drawing either on geopolitical or socioeconomic factors that determine humanitarian action. The first approach is exemplified by Michael Barnett's proposition to distinguish ages of "imperial humanitarianism" (up to 1945), "neo-humanitarianism" (1945–1989), and "liberal humanitarianism". Norbert Götz, Georgina Brewis, and Steffen Werther are advocates of the socioeconomic and cultural approach, arguing that there have been ages of "ad hoc humanitarianism" (up to c. 1900), "organized humanitarianism" (c. 1900–1970), and "expressive humanitarianism" (since 1970). They suggest we might currently be entering "a novel kind of defensive humanitarianism with roots in the expressive age, with automated interfaces, and with thick 'firewalls' between donors and recipients." However, a neat seperation between donor and recipient is conventionally difficult to draw. The employment of 'local staff', the active call for help from people in need and the surge in local humanitarian organizations all suggest the intimate relation between donor and recipient.

Emergency response
Today, humanitarianism is particularly used to describe the thinking and doctrines behind the emergency response to humanitarian crises. In such cases it argues for a humanitarian response based on humanitarian principles, particularly the principle of humanity. Nicholas de Torrente, former Executive Director of Médecins Sans Frontières USA writes:

"The most important principles of humanitarian action are humanity, neutrality, independence and impartiality, which posits the conviction that all people have equal dignity by virtue of their being human based solely on need, without discrimination among recipients. Humanitarian organizations must refrain from taking part in hostilities or taking actions that advantage one side of the conflict over another, the action serves the interests of political, religious, or other agendas.These fundamental principles serve two essential purposes. They embody humanitarian action’s single-minded purpose of alleviating suffering, unconditionally and without any ulterior motive. They also serve as background document to develop operational tools that help in obtaining both the consent of communities for the presence and activities of humanitarian organizations, particularly in highly volatile contexts."

Digital humanitarianism

In 2005, a question was raised as to whether Wikipedia can be seen as digital humanitarianism.

Patrick Meier used the term 'digital humanitarianism' to describe crowdmapping for the 2010 Haiti earthquake. In 2011, Paul Conneally gave a TED talk on digital humanitarianism in which he states that humanitarianism's "origins are firmly rooted in the analogue age" with "a major shift coming". In 2015 he authored the book Digital Humanitarians: How Big Data Is Changing the Face of Humanitarian Response.

Vincent Fevrier notes that "social media can benefit the humanitarian sector ... by providing information to give better situational awareness to organisations for broad strategic planning and logistics" and that "crisis mapping really emerged in 2010 during the Haiti earthquake" with "software and digital humanitarian platforms such as Standby Task Force, OpenStreetMap, and many others" being active during many disasters since then.

In fact, the role of social media in digital humanitarian efforts is a considerable one. Ten days after the 2010 earthquake, the "Hope for Haiti Now" telethon event was launched in the United States, effectively taking over the mediasphere and reaching hundreds of millions of households and viewers. It focused on appealing to the viewing public's empathy for the survivors of the disaster, allowing ordinary citizens to help in a collective relief effort by contributing money donations to NGOs providing Humanitarian aid to earthquake survivors. The telethon attracted support through a variety of celebrity musical performances and staged calls for empathy, using digital social networks to disseminate its appeal to the moral responsibility of the viewer-consumers who are able to reinforce identification with a national identity of the American 'savior' through participation in this Humanitarian project.

During the summer of 2010, when open fires raged across Russia, causing many to die from smog inhalation, the use of social media allowed digital humanitarians to map the areas in need of support. This is because Russians who were hoping to be evacuated were posting online about the conditions they were in which prompted thousands of Russian bloggers to coordinate relief efforts online. The digital humanitarian efforts in Russia were crucial to responding to the fires in 2010 considering the Russian government was vastly unprepared to deal with such a large-scale disaster.

Within digital humanitarianism, big data has featured strongly in efforts to improve digital humanitarian work and produces a limited understanding of how a crisis is unfolding. It has been argued that Big Data is constitutive of a social relation in which digital humanitarians claim both the formal humanitarian sector and victims of crises need the services and labor that can be provided by digital humanitarians.

See also
 Consortium of British Humanitarian Agencies
Human rights
Humanitarian Accountability Partnership International
Humanitarian aid
Humanitarian education
Humanitarian principles
Humanitarian-political
Humanity (virtue)
 International Federation of Red Cross and Red Crescent Societies
International humanitarian law
 International Red Cross and Red Crescent Movement
 International Rescue Committee
 Red Swastika Society, in China
World Humanitarian Day
ReliefWeb Humanitarian News service
 List of National Red Cross and Red Crescent Societies
 UniRef
Humanitarianism (Raëlianism)

References

External links

The Humanitarian Organisations Dataset (HOD): 2,505 organizations active in the humanitarian sector
Cotter, Cédric: Red Cross, in: 1914–1918-online. International Encyclopedia of the First World War.

Herrmann, Irène, Palmieri, Daniel: International Committee of the Red Cross, in: 1914–1918-online. International Encyclopedia of the First World War.
Gatrell, Peter, Gill, Rebecca, Little, Branden, Piller, Elisabeth: Discussion: Humanitarianism, in: 1914–1918-online. International Encyclopedia of the First World War.

Further reading

 Barnett, Michael. 2013. "Humanitarian Governance." Annual Review of Political Science.
 Bass, Gary J, "Humanitarian Impulses", The New York Times Magazine, 2008.
 Bonhoeffer, Dietrich Ethics, Fontana, 1963.
 de Torrent, Nicholas: "Humanitarian Action Under Attack: Reflections on the Iraq War" Harvard Human Rights Journal, Volume 17, Spring 2004 Harvard University Retrieved 13 July 2007
 Feldman, Ilana: Life lived in relief: Humanitarian predicaments and Palestinian refugee politics. University of California Press, 2018.
 
 Glover, Jonathon, Humanity, Pimlico, 2001

 Moorehead, Caroline, Dunant's Dream, War, Switzerland and the History of the Red Cross, Carroll & Graf, 1999

 Waters, Tony (2001). Bureaucratizing the Good Samaritan: The Limitations of Humanitarian Relief Operations.  Boulder: Westview Press.
 Wilson, Richard Ashby and Richard D. Brown, eds., Humanitarianism and Suffering: The Mobilization of Empathy. Cambridge University Press, 2009.

Humanitarian aid
Human rights